Arctiopais is a monotypic moth genus of the family Noctuidae erected by Karl Jordan in 1896. Its only species, Arctiopais ambusta, was first described by Paul Mabille in 1881. It is found on Madagascar.

References

Agaristinae
Monotypic moth genera